Stefan Meyer-Kahlen (born 1968, in Düsseldorf) is a German programmer of the computer chess programs Shredder and the entire Zappa series. , his program had won 18 titles as World Computer Chess Champion. Four of the titles were blitz championships, and one was a Chess960 championship. He also invented the Universal Chess Interface, a chess engine protocol.

External links
 Shredder Computer Chess

Computer chess people
1968 births
Living people